Essential Marvel was a line published by Marvel Comics from 1996 - 2013 that reprints vintage comic book material in paperback format. Each black-and-white volume reprints approximately 20-30 issues of a classic Marvel title (mostly from the Silver Age or Bronze Age). Each Essential contains between 450 and 650 pages, printed on coarse, matte-quality paper.

DC Comics has a similar range of black-and-white reprint paperbacks, Showcase Presents (in the same way, the Marvel Masterworks line is the equivalent of DC's DC Archive Editions).

History
The Essential range launched in October 1996 with the joint release of Essential X-Men Vol. 1, Essential Wolverine Vol. 1 and Essential The Amazing Spider-Man Vol. 1. While Essential The Amazing Spider-Man started with Spider-Man's first appearance in the Silver Age (collecting Amazing Fantasy #15 and The Amazing Spider-Man #1-20), Marvel chose to skip ahead to Giant-Size X-Men #1 and Uncanny X-Men #94-119, the relaunch of the title that sparked the X-Men's popularity in the late 1970s and 1980s. The decision to skip the original X-Men in favor of starting with the more well-known "All-New, All-Different" X-Men was controversial, though Marvel ultimately went back and began a new collection of Essential volumes, titled Essential Classic X-Men, to collect the earliest X-Men stories (originally titled Essential Uncanny X-Men in the first volume).

A new trade dress for the line was introduced in 2001. All the older volumes (excluding Essential Conan Vol. 1) were eventually reprinted with the new design. The new printings also corrected printing mistakes from previous volumes (such as the fact that both Essential X-Men Vol. 1 and Vol. 2 both have missing pages from their earlier printings) and reshuffled content to put volume breaks in more logical places, continuity-wise.

From May 2005 onward, many of the volumes were reprinted for a third time, with different cover artwork. Initially, the Essential line used newly produced artwork, but these new printings used art from the material they reprinted; the legal indicia in each volume listed them as "Second Edition, First Printing".

In 2008, the line's trade dress was revised and given a new look, again initially on older volumes that were going back to press for new printings.

Marvel came under criticism for censoring some of the Essential books, specifically Essential Tomb of Dracula Vol. 3 and Vol. 4, in which digital editing was used to remove or obscure brief nudity. Both volumes contained reprints of Dracula stories originally published by Marvel in magazine format, which permitted the use of nudity in artwork.

The last volumes were published in December 2013, with the line being cancelled and replaced with the Epic Collection.

Volumes

See also
 List of comic books on CD/DVD

Notes and references

External links
 Marvel Essential.com

Marvel Comics lines
1997 comics debuts
Comic book collection books